South Londonderry is an unincorporated village and census-designated place (CDP) in the town of Londonderry, Windham County, Vermont, United States. As of the 2020 census, it had a population of 147. The center of the village comprises the South Londonderry Village Historic District.

The CDP is in northwestern Windham County, in the south-central part of the town of Londonderry. It sits on both sides of the West River, a southeast-flowing tributary of the Connecticut River. Vermont Route 100 passes through the community, leading north  to Londonderry village and south  to Jamaica.

References 

Populated places in Windham County, Vermont
Census-designated places in Windham County, Vermont
Census-designated places in Vermont